La mère éducatrice (French: Motherhood and Education) was a feminist anarchist magazine founded by Madeleine Vernet. It was first published in October 1917. Its headquarters was in Levallois-Perret. Madeleine Vernet also edited the magazine. The magazine adopted a pacifist, socialist and educative stance. In line with this approach, it argued that the major way to end war is education. It existed until 1939.

References

External links

1917 establishments in France
1939 disestablishments in France
Anarchist periodicals
Defunct political magazines published in France
Education magazines
Feminism in France
Feminist magazines
French-language magazines
Magazines established in 1917
Magazines disestablished in 1939
Magazines published in Paris
Socialist magazines
Women's magazines published in France